Kheyrabad (also Romanized as Kheyrābād; also known as Bāgh-e Kher, Bāgh-i-Kher, Hairābād, Khairābād, and Kheir Abad Hoomeh) is a village in Fajr Rural District, in the Central District of Yazd County, Yazd Province, Iran. At the 2006 census, its population was 5,794, in 1,596 families.

References 

Populated places in Yazd County